The Tahoe–Yosemite Trail (TYT) is a long-distance trail in the Sierra Nevada mountain range of California. The trail courses  from Meeks Bay at Lake Tahoe to Tuolumne Meadows in Yosemite National Park. The trail is a foot and equestrian path that passes through the Desolation, Mokelumne, Carson-Iceberg, Emigrant, and Yosemite Wilderness Areas and the Meiss Country (Dardanelles) Roadless Area.

History
The United States Forest Service had begun work on the Tahoe–Yosemite Trail by 1916 with the intent of providing a path from Meeks Bay at Lake Tahoe to the northern boundary of Yosemite National Park. The expectation was that the National Park Service would then complete the trail south to Tuolumne Meadows and connect it to the John Muir Trail (JMT). Work on the trail was interrupted in 1918 due to the country's involvement in World War I.

The Pacific Crest Trail (PCT) was first proposed in the 1920s and was to link several existing long-distance trails to create a continuous path from Canada to Mexico. Early maps and descriptions of the PCT delineate these trail segments, which included the TYT and adjacent JMT. The PCT path described in the Federal Register in 1973, however, does not make reference to the TYT, and today the TYT is considered an unofficial path.

Routes

The Winnett Route

First published in 1970, Thomas Winnett's The Tahoe-Yosemite Trail popularized the trail. He described a  route that combined segments of the PCT path, historical TYT/PCT paths that had long been rerouted off roads and moved onto newly constructed trail, and altogether new routes chosen by the author. The result was a route that included Forest Service and Park Service maintained trails, road walks, trails no longer maintained, and cross-country routes through trailless terrain. Winnett hoped the book would encourage the Forest Service to officially recognize his TYT route, but even with five editions, the last published in 1987, the TYT remained an unofficial route.

There is continued interest in Winnett's route for hikers seeking remoteness, the challenge of route finding and cross-country travel, and the opportunity to visit lower-elevation ecosystems as the route detours west of and below the Sierra Crest.

The PCT Route

Hiking from Meeks Bay to Tuolumne Meadows can be done on officially recognized and maintained trails. The Forest Service recognizes the beginning of the TYT as the Meeks Bay Trailhead. The trail runs , generally southwest, to join the PCT one mile north of Middle Velma Lake.

Hiking

A permit is required to hike the TYT and can be obtained from the Lake Tahoe Basin Management Unit for hikers beginning at the Meeks Bay Trailhead and from Yosemite National Park for hikers beginning at Tuolumne Meadows. Food must be stored in approved hard-sided bear canisters within the backcountry of Yosemite National Park.

The TYT crosses paved roads at or near Echo Summit, Carson Pass, Ebbetts Pass, and Sonora Pass, which facilitates resupplying for thru hikers and provides trail access for section hikers.

See also
 Ecology of the Sierra Nevada
 John Muir Trail
 Long-distance trails in the United States
 Pacific Crest Trail
 Tahoe Rim Trail

Notes

Lake Tahoe
Long-distance trails in the United States
Yosemite National Park
Hiking trails in California
Sierra Nevada (United States)